Hananasif or Hanna Nassif is an administrative ward in the Kinondoni district of the Dar es Salaam Region of Tanzania. According to the 2002 census, the ward has a total population of 32,023.

References 

Kinondoni District
Wards of Dar es Salaam Region